Ibadan Airport  is an airport serving Ibadan, the capital of the Oyo State of Nigeria. It was commissioned by Joseph Wayas, a former senate president of Nigeria, in June 1982.

Airlines and destinations

See also
Transport in Nigeria
List of airports in Nigeria

References

External links
SkyVector Aeronautical Charts
OurAirports - Ibadan

Airports in Nigeria
Ibadan
Buildings and structures in Ibadan
Airports in Yorubaland